Keskusta ("City Centre") is a main district of the city of Tampere, Finland, formed by less than 20 suburbs in the city centre. Over 63,000 people live in Keskusta. It is located along the Tammerkoski rapids and its most important services include Tampere City Hall and the Market Hall.

Districts
Finlayson, Nalkala, Amuri, Kaakinmaa, Pyynikinrinne, Särkänniemi, Tampella, Jussinkylä, Kyttälä, Ratina, Osmonmäki, Tammela, Tulli, Kalevanharju, Hatanpää, Pyynikki.

Gallery

See also
 Hämeenkatu
 Iides
 Sampo

References

External links

 City of Tampere - Official Website

Keskusta (Tampere)